Christian Gerrard "Chris" Bordeleau (born September 23, 1947) is a Canadian former professional ice hockey forward. He played in the National Hockey League between 1969 and 1972, and the World Hockey Association between 1972 and 1979.

Playing career
Bordeleau started his National Hockey League career with the Montreal Canadiens in 1969. He also played for the Chicago Black Hawks and St. Louis Blues. He left the NHL after the 1972 season and would also play in the World Hockey Association for the Winnipeg Jets and Quebec Nordiques. He won the Stanley Cup in 1969 with the Montreal Canadiens. Christian's brothers Jean-Pierre and Paulin Bordeleau were also professional hockey players.

Honours
In 1977, Christian was a member of the World Hockey Association's Avco Cup Champions the Quebec Nordiques.

In 2012, he was inducted into the World Hockey Association Hall of Fame.

Career statistics

Regular season and playoffs

References

External links

1947 births
Living people
Canadian ice hockey centres
Chicago Blackhawks players
French Quebecers
Houston Apollos players
Ice hockey people from Quebec
Montreal Canadiens players
Montreal Junior Canadiens players
Quebec Nordiques (WHA) players
Salt Lake Golden Eagles (CHL) players
St. Louis Blues players
Sportspeople from Rouyn-Noranda
Stanley Cup champions
Winnipeg Jets (WHA) players